Locker Sixty-Nine is a 1962 British film based on a story by Edgar Wallace, and an episode of the Edgar Wallace Mysteries.

Cast
Eddie Byrne as Simon York
Paul Daneman as Frank Griffiths
Walter Brown as Craig
Penelope Horner as Julie Denver
Edward Underdown as Bennett Sanders
Clarissa Stolz as Eva Terila
John Carson as Miguel Terila
John Glyn-Jones as Inspector Roon
Edwin Richfield as Peters
Alfred Burke as Davison
Philip Latham as Dr. Trent
Leonard Sachs as Spencer
Larry Burns as Doorkeeper
Kenneth Thornett as Constable (as Keneth Thornett)
Norma Parnell as Maggie
Valerie Van Ost as Showgirl (uncredited)

References

External links
Review at Kine Weekly
Locker Sixty Nine at BBFC
Locker Sixty Nine at BFI
Locker Sixty Nine at IMDb

1962 films
British drama films
1962 drama films
Edgar Wallace Mysteries
British black-and-white films
1960s English-language films
1960s British films